In general relativity, Regge calculus is a formalism for producing simplicial approximations of spacetimes that are solutions to the Einstein field equation.  The calculus was introduced by the Italian theoretician Tullio Regge in 1961.

Overview
The starting point for Regge's work is the fact that every four dimensional time orientable Lorentzian manifold admits a triangulation into simplices.  Furthermore, the spacetime curvature can be expressed in terms of deficit angles associated with 2-faces where arrangements of 4-simplices meet.  These 2-faces play the same role as the vertices where arrangements of triangles meet in a triangulation of a 2-manifold, which is easier to visualize.  Here a vertex with a positive angular deficit represents a concentration of positive Gaussian curvature, whereas a vertex with a negative angular deficit represents a concentration of negative Gaussian curvature.

The deficit angles can be computed directly from the various edge lengths in the triangulation, which is equivalent to saying that the Riemann curvature tensor can be computed from the metric tensor of a Lorentzian manifold.  Regge showed that the vacuum field equations can be reformulated as a restriction on these deficit angles.  He then showed how this can be applied to evolve an initial spacelike hyperslice according to the vacuum field equation.

The result is that, starting with a triangulation of some spacelike hyperslice (which must itself satisfy a certain constraint equation), one can eventually obtain a simplicial approximation to a vacuum solution.  This can be applied to difficult problems in numerical relativity such as simulating the collision of two black holes.

The elegant idea behind Regge calculus has motivated the construction of further generalizations of this idea.  In particular, Regge calculus has been adapted to study quantum gravity.

See also

Numerical relativity
Quantum gravity
Euclidean quantum gravity
Piecewise linear manifold
Euclidean simplex
Path integral formulation
Lattice gauge theory
Wheeler–DeWitt equation
Mathematics of general relativity
Causal dynamical triangulation
Ricci calculus

Notes

References
  
   See chapter 42.
  Chapters 4 and 6.   
  
   Available (subscribers only) at "Classical and Quantum Gravity".
  
  eprint
   Available at "Living Reviews of Relativity". See section 3.
   Available (subscribers only) at "Classical and Quantum Gravity".

External links
Regge calculus on ScienceWorld

Mathematical methods in general relativity
Simplicial sets
Numerical analysis